The 22nd Guam Legislature was a meeting of the Guam Legislature. It convened in Hagatna, Guam on January 4, 1993, and ended on January 2, 1995, during the 3rd and 4th years of Joseph F. Ada's 2nd Gubernatorial Term.

In the 1992 Guamanian general election, the Democratic Party of Guam won a fourteen-to-seven (14-7) supermajority of seats in the Guam Legislature.

Francisco R. Santos died in 1993. His son, Francis E. Santos ran for and won his vacated seat.

Party Summary

Leadership

Legislative
 Speaker: Joe T. San Agustin
 Vice Speaker:
 Francisco R. Santos (until August 9, 1993)
 John P. Aguon (from August 9, 1993)
 Legislative Secretary: Pilar C. Lujan
 Majority Leader: Don Parkinson

Membership

References 

Politics of Guam
Political organizations based in Guam
Legislature of Guam